Černoch (feminine Černochová) is a Czech surname meaning "black person", a reference to individual's darker skin or hair. Notable people include:
 Jana Černochová, Czech politician
 János Csernoch, Slovak-Hungarian Catholic clergyman
 Jiří Černoch, Czech ice hockey player
 Karel Černoch, Czech singer
 Martin Černoch, Czech footballer

See also
 Černý, Czech surname meaning "black"
 

Czech-language surnames